Henry William Orth (November 20, 1897 – March 25, 1980) was an American football guard who played one season with the Cincinnati Celts of the American Professional Football Association. He played college football at Miami University and attended Chillicothe High School in Chillicothe, Ohio. He also served as football coach at Zanesville High School in the early 1920s.

References

External links
Just Sports Stats

1897 births
1980 deaths
Players of American football from Ohio
American football guards
Miami RedHawks football players
Cincinnati Celts players
Sportspeople from Chillicothe, Ohio